The Recoleta Cultural Centre (in Spanish: Centro Cultural Recoleta) is an exhibition and cultural events centre located in the barrio of Recoleta, Buenos Aires, Argentina.
It holds sculptures and exhibitions, as well as concerts and artistic presentations and workshops of diverse types.
in September/October 2006 it held the wildly successful onedotzero festival attracting over 20,000 people in 3 days for installations, live performances, screenings and music.

History

The building where the cultural centre is located was originally donated to the Franciscans in  1716. The blueprints of the construction were drawn by Jesuit architects Juan Krauss and Juan Wolf, while the design of the façade and interiors are attributed to Andrés Blanqui.

The building, finished in 1732, is one of the oldest in the city. With the arrival of the May Revolution and the declaration of independence during the first part of the 19th century, the building changed purposes. Manuel Belgrano founded a drawing school there, and since the 1870s it served as a shelter for the destitute. Torcuato de Alvear, first mayor of Buenos Aires, beautified Recoleta as well as the cultural centre; Juan Antonio Buschiazzo gave it an Italian style and created the chapel currently used as an auditorium.

The second important renovation took place around 1980 by Clorindo Testa, Jacques Bedel and Luis Benedit, when the building was planned as a cultural centre.

Gallery

External links

 Centro Cultural Recoleta's official site

Recoleta, Centro Cultural
Recoleta, Centro Cultural
Tourist attractions in Buenos Aires
Arts centres in Argentina